The 1997 Torneo Godó was a men's tennis tournament played on Clay in Barcelona, Spain that was part of the International Series Gold of the 1997 ATP Tour. It was the 45th edition of the tournament and was held from 14–21 April.

Seeds
Champion seeds are indicated in bold text while text in italics indicates the round in which those seeds were eliminated.

Draw

Finals

Top half

Bottom half

References

Doubles
Godo